Pascal "Panzer" Krauss (born April 19, 1987) is a retired German mixed martial artist who competed in the welterweight division of the Ultimate Fighting Championship (UFC). His German nickname translates to 'tank' in English.

Early life and education
Krauss was born on April 19, 1987, in Breisach, West Germany. He developed an interest for martial arts was woken when he started boxing at the age of 14. His five-year commitment to the sport earned him a German junior boxing title and a second place in the International German Championships. The latter being the only loss in his 18-fight amateur boxing career. He was also a member in the youth team of  Freiburg's first division wrestling club 'RKG Freiburg 2000'. Krauss studied sport science at the University of Freiburg.

Career

Mixed martial arts
After an encounter with German Judo black belt and MMA practioneer Gregor Herb  in 2007 Pascal also started training Brazilian Jiu-Jitsu (BJJ) and MMA. He made his professional MMA debut in January 2008 in his native Germany.

In 2009, Pascal spent some time in Rio de Janeiro, Brazil, to train under BJJ master Roberto “Gordo” Correa. After eight weeks of training alongside Antonio Braga Neto, Rafael dos Anjos, Delson Heleno and MMA-legend Vitor Belfort, amongst others, he was awarded a BJJ blue belt. A 2010 trip to the United States lead Pascal to spend some time at  Renzo Gracie's MMA academy in New York City and the Cesar Gracie MMA team  - home to renowned fighters such as Jake Shields, Nick Diaz, Nate Diaz and Gilbert Melendez.

After beating John Quinn at the May 22, 2010 Cage Warriors Fighting Championship Right to Fight event he became the Cage Warriors welterweight champion. He succeeded Dan Hardy, who had to vacate the title after signing with the UFC in 2008.

The MMA-website Sherdog released an interview with Pascal on July 24 for their "Prospect Watch"-column. Sherdog also named him in a July 2010 article on 'the top 10 undefeated European prospects'.

Ultimate Fighting Championship
In August 2010, Pascal signed a four-fight contract with the Ultimate Fighting Championship. He was expected to make his promotional debut at UFC 122 in Oberhausen, Germany against the likewise undefeated Kenny Robertson. In mid October, Robertson backed out of the fight due to injury and was replaced by fellow undefeated UFC newcomer Mark Scanlon. Krauss won via unanimous decision.

Krauss was expected to face John Hathaway on November 5, 2011, at UFC 138. However, Krauss pulled out of the bout citing a shoulder injury, and was replaced by Matt Brown.

Krauss/Hathaway eventually took place on May 5, 2012, at UFC on Fox 3. Krauss lost the fight via unanimous decision.

Krauss was expected to face UFC newcomer Gunnar Nelson on September 29, 2012, at UFC on Fuel TV 5. However, Krauss was forced to pull out of the fight after he received a strong knee strike to the ribcage while sparring and had to be rushed to the hospital after complaining of chest pain. Doctors at Freiburg University Hospital diagnosed him with severely bruised ribs, an inflamed chest muscle and a dislocated vertebra, rendering Krauss unable to compete and was replaced on the card by DaMarques Johnson.

Krauss faced Mike Stumpf on January 26, 2013, at UFC on Fox 6. He won the fight via unanimous decision.

Krauss faced Hyun Gyu Lim on August 31, 2013, at UFC 164. He lost by KO in the first round. Despite the loss, the fight earned Krauss his second Fight of the Night bonus award.

Krauss was expected to face promotional newcomer Adam Khaliev on January 25, 2014, at UFC on Fox 10.  However, the bout was scrapped in the weeks leading up to the event as Khaliev had not been granted clearance for the fight.

Championships and accomplishments
Cage Warriors
Cage Warriors Welterweight Championship (One time)
Ultimate Fighting Championship
Fight of the Night (Two times)

Mixed martial arts record

|-
| Loss
| align=center| 11–2
| Hyun Gyu Lim
| KO (knee and punches)
| UFC 164
| 
| align=center| 1
| align=center| 3:58
| Milwaukee, Wisconsin, United States
| 
|-
| Win
| align=center| 11–1
| Mike Stumpf
| Decision (unanimous)
| UFC on Fox: Johnson vs. Dodson
| 
| align=center| 3
| align=center| 5:00
| Chicago, Illinois, United States
| 
|-
| Loss
| align=center| 10–1
| John Hathaway
| Decision (unanimous)
| UFC on Fox: Diaz vs. Miller
| 
| align=center| 3
| align=center| 5:00
| East Rutherford, New Jersey, United States
| 
|-
| Win
| align=center| 10–0
| Mark Scanlon
| Decision (unanimous)
| UFC 122
| 
| align=center| 3
| align=center| 5:00
| Oberhausen, Germany
| 
|-
| Win
| align=center| 9–0
| John Quinn
| Submission (rear-naked choke)
| Cage Warriors 37: Right to Fight
| 
| align=center| 2
| align=center| 4:47
| Birmingham, United Kingdom
| 
|-
| Win
| align=center| 8–0
| Srdjan Sekulic
| TKO (punches)
| WFC 9: Restart
| 
| align=center| 2
| align=center| 2:24
| Ljubljana, Slovenia
| 
|-
| Win
| align=center| 7–0
| Mehdi Mahouche
| Submission (rear-naked choke)
| Fight Night Freiburg 2
| 
| align=center| 1
| align=center| 4:23
| Freiburg, Germany
| 
|-
| Win
| align=center| 6–0
| Gökmen Dali
| Submission (D'Arce choke)
| Shooto: Switzerland 6
| 
| align=center| 2
| align=center| 4:33
| Zurich, Switzerland
| 
|-
| Win
| align=center| 5–0
| Dominique Stetefeld
| Submission (rear-naked choke)
| La Onda: Fight Night Special 3
| 
| align=center| 1
| align=center| 1:09
| Halberstadt, Germany
| 
|-
| Win
| align=center| 4–0
| Kamil Lipinski
| TKO (punches)
| Hamburger Käfig: Second Strike
| 
| align=center| 2
| align=center| 2:33
| Hamburg, Germany
| 
|-
| Win
| align=center| 3–0
| Kristian Ozimec
| Submission (rear-naked choke)
| Fight Night Freiburg
| 
| align=center| 1
| align=center| 3:24
| Freiburg, Germany
| 
|-
| Win
| align=center| 2–0
| Michael Heist
| Submission (americana)
| Gorilla Fight 2
| 
| align=center| 1
| align=center| 4:45
| Mannheim, Germany
| 
|-
| Win
| align=center| 1–0
| Manuel Sagmeister
| Submission (kimura)
| This is Shido 3
| 
| align=center| 1
| align=center| 3:30
| Lossburg, Germany
|

See also
 List of current UFC fighters
 List of male mixed martial artists

References

External links

Official UFC Profile

 Team Grappling Arts

1987 births
Living people
People from Breisach
Sportspeople from Freiburg (region)
German male boxers
German male sport wrestlers
German male judoka
German male mixed martial artists
Mixed martial artists utilizing judo
Mixed martial artists utilizing freestyle wrestling
Mixed martial artists utilizing boxing
Mixed martial artists utilizing Brazilian jiu-jitsu
German practitioners of Brazilian jiu-jitsu
Welterweight mixed martial artists
Ultimate Fighting Championship male fighters
21st-century German people